Dragan Roganović (born 15 November 1978), better known by his stage name Dirty South is a Serbian-Australian DJ, record producer and remixer based in Melbourne.

Biography
Born in Belgrade, SFR Yugoslavia, now Serbia, Dirty South's producing career developed in tandem with his DJing career. He got his start at the age of 13 after he relocated to Melbourne, Australia, where he currently resides. Influenced by everything around him, the artist started improvising with his old NEC Hi-Fi and mixing with the tape decks, and then started making bootlegs and mashups, which eventually led to getting a computer, software, and keyboard that resulted in his first official production in 2004 as Dirty South. He used his family computer to create remixes and mashups of other artists' tracks and distributed them worldwide, which caught the attention of Australian Vicious Vinyl records, who signed him in 2005.

Since then, the Australian-based DJ has received numerous honours for his work, including: two ARIA nominations (Australian Music Industry's top accolade) for "Best Dance Release" in 2005 and 2006, he was voted "Most Popular Producer Nationally" in the 2007 InTheMix 50 DJ Poll, he achieved the number one position in the Australian Club Charts with his remix of "It's Too Late" by Evermore in late 2006, and he was the first Australian artist since 1999 to win one of Pete Tong's Essential New Tune awards. He also ranked second in the annual InTheMix 50 DJ Poll in 2007 and he has been ranked in the DJ Mag Top 100 DJ poll every year since 2007.

Dirty South teamed up with British DJ Paul Harris in 2007 and produced "Better Day," which earned Dirty South another essential radio play by Pete Tong. He also remixed a number of songs, including "Reach For Me", "Feels Like Home", and "Higher State of Consciousness" with fellow Melburnians TV Rock. In late July 2007, he joined together with MYNC Project to release "Everybody Freakin". Another one of his honours came when his single, "Let It Go", was released on Axwell's record label Axtone in 2007.

Additionally, he has also been nominated for two Grammy Awards – he provided a remix for Kaskade's song "Sorry", which was nominated for a 2008 Grammy Award for Best Remixed Recording, and he was then nominated in 2011 in the same category for a remix he and Axwell did for The Temper Trap's "Sweet Disposition".

Dirty South's track "Phazing", which featured vocals by Rudy, was one of the top sellers on Beatport when it was released in 2010. In 2011, he produced the track "Anything" for UK singer/rapper Example's No. 1 album Playing in the Shadows and in 2012, he produced the song "Say Nothing", the lead single from Example's fourth studio album, The Evolution of Man. Dirty South has produced, collaborated, or remixed for artists such as Snoop Dogg, The Pussycat Dolls, Kaskade, U2, Diddy – Dirty Money, The Temper Trap, David Guetta, Sebastian Ingrosso and more than 50 artists in total.

In August 2012, Dirty South released the single "City of Dreams" with Alesso featuring vocals from Ruben Haze. It was initially released exclusively on Beatport and it reached the No. 1 position on the Beatport Top 100 its first week of release. In support of "City of Dreams", Dirty South announced his largest North American tour to date, the City of Dreams Tour. The 30+ stop tour took him across North America from September through to December 2012 and included stops at venues such as New York City's Roseland Ballroom and Los Angeles' Palladium.

He is the older brother of professional footballer and former Melbourne Heart goalkeeper Nikola Roganovic. From January 2015 to December 2017, Nikola played in the National Premier League for South Melbourne.

Discography

Albums

Extended Plays

Charting singles

Awards and nominations

ARIA Music Awards
The ARIA Music Awards is an annual awards ceremony that recognises excellence, innovation, and achievement across all genres of Australian music..

|-
| 2005 || "Sleazy"|| ARIA Award for Best Dance Release || 
|-
| 2006 || Dirty South ||  Best Dance Release || 
|-

References

External links

 Official website
 Interview on Clubplanet

1978 births
Remixers
Australian DJs
Australian dance musicians
Australian electronic musicians
Living people
Australian people of Serbian descent
Progressive house musicians
Electronic dance music DJs
Anjunabeats artists